Moran is a place in Portage County, in the U.S. state of Ohio. It is located in the western edge of Streetsboro, near its border with Hudson along Aurora Hudson Road.

History
Moran had its start on a stagecoach line and was also known as Jesse, Moran Station, and Streetsboro Corners. Later, it was a stop on the Wheeling and Lake Erie Railway. A post office called Jesse was established in 1887, and remained in operation until 1924. Interstate 480 was built through the area in the mid-1960s.

Moran has remnants of a portion of the unfinished "Clinton Air Line", railroad, reportedly named for DeWitt Clinton. A bridge foundation remains at Tinker's Creek and some of the line was visible during the construction of the "Step Two" manufacturing plant. Also contains a small Civil War Veterans burial site (on private property).

Notable person
Bobbie L. Sterne, mayor of Cincinnati in the late 1970s, was born at Moran in 1919.

References

Neighborhoods in Ohio
Populated places in Portage County, Ohio